Mohyeldin Ramadan Hussein (born 20 June 1969) is an Egyptian wrestler. He competed in the men's Greco-Roman 82 kg at the 1992 Summer Olympics.

References

1969 births
Living people
Egyptian male sport wrestlers
Olympic wrestlers of Egypt
Wrestlers at the 1992 Summer Olympics
Place of birth missing (living people)
20th-century Egyptian people